Wigand Siebel (born 4 January 1929 in Freudenberg, Westphalia, died 29 August 2014) was a German sociologist.

Scientific career 

After his graduation, Siebel worked for the Social Research Center of Dortmund.  In 1964, he was appointed a lecturer at the Ruhr University at Bochum. In 1965, he was appointed Professor of Sociology at the University of the Saarlands in Saarbrücken.

The following is his academic timeline:

Studied in Kiel, Munich and Münster.
1955-1959: Fellow at the Institute for Christian Social Sciences in Münster.
1955: Received his Doctorate in Political Science at Münster.
1955-1959: Publishing Company of Freiburg
1959-1964: Fellow of Social Research at the University of Münster in Dortmund.
1964: Promotion to academic status in Münster
Since 1965: Full Professor at Saarbrücken

He is the Emeritus Professor of Sociology at the University of Saarland.

Life 

Siebel was raised an Evangelical Protestant and converted to Catholicism a short time before Vatican II. As a Conservative Christian, he became involved with the Catholic Traditionalist movement resisting the adoption of the Modernist ideas into Catholicism as a result of the Aggiornamento and Vatican II.

Controversy 

The French Traditionalist priest, George de Nantes wrote in his The Catholic Counter-Reformation in the XXth Century, #220, June 1989, page 20, para 1 & 2 that Wigand Siebel and his followers teach that, with the Modernist apostasy, the Catholic Papacy has ceased to be or that it has come to an end, a teaching which contradicts Catholic teaching that is strongly emphasised.

Sources

External links 
 
Oratorium von der göttlichen Wahrheit

1929 births
2014 deaths
People from Siegen-Wittgenstein
German sociologists
Converts to Roman Catholicism from Evangelicalism
People from the Province of Westphalia
German Roman Catholics
German traditionalist Catholics
Sedevacantists
German male writers